Rankin Glacier is a glacier about 12 nautical miles (22 km) long on the east side of Palmer Land. It flows southeast and then east along the south side of Schirmacher Massif to join the Cline Glacier just inland from the head of Odom Inlet. Mapped by United States Geological Survey (USGS) in 1974. Named by Advisory Committee on Antarctic Names (US-ACAN) for John S. Rankin, United States Antarctic Research Program (USARP) biologist on the International Weddell Sea Oceanographic Expeditions, 1968 and 1969.

Glaciers of Palmer Land